The United States Department of Defense acknowledges holding approximately a dozen Bosnian citizens detained at Guantanamo Bay.

A total of 778 detainees have been held in the Guantanamo Bay detention camps, in Cuba since the camps opened on January 11, 2002. The camp population peaked in 2004 to approximately 660. Only 19 new detainees, all "high value detainees" have been transferred there since the United States Supreme Court's ruling in Rasul v. Bush.

Bosnian detainees in Guantanamo

See also
Algerian Six

References

External links

Lists of Guantanamo Bay detainees by nationality
Bosnia and Herzegovina–United States relations